Ilza Sternicka-Niekrasz (September 20, 1898 — June 27, 1932) was a Russian/Polish pianist and composer.

Sternicka-Niekrasz was born in St. Petersburg. She studied in Saint Petersburg Conservatory under Alexander Glazunov and Vasily Kalafati then in Warsaw Conservatory under Henryk Melcer-Szczawiński, Roman Statkowski and Karol Szymanowski.

Compositions 
 Baśń, fantasy for piano and orchestra (1927)
 Szachy, symphonic grotesque (1931)
 Oratorium (fragments performed in 1929 in Poznan)
 Variations for string quartet
 Double fugue for string quintet
 Groteski dla dzieci for flute, clarinet and bassoon (for children)
 Kolory, suite for piano (a fragment published in 1931)
 Piano sonata in F minor
 Songs for voice with piano (including Ojcze nasz, published in 1935)
 Songs for children

References

External links 
 
 Entry in Encyklopedia muzyki PWN

20th-century classical composers
Polish composers
Polish classical composers
Polish women composers
String quartet composers